Jake Mason is an Australian musician, producer and songwriter. He is a founding member of Cookin' on 3 Burners and the frontman of the Jake Mason Trio. The Jake Mason Trio (Mason, James Sherlock and Danny Fischer) was nominated for the 2018 ARIA Award for Best Jazz Album for their album The Stranger In The Mirror.

Discography

Albums

Awards and nominations

ARIA Music Awards
The ARIA Music Awards is an annual awards ceremony that recognises excellence, innovation, and achievement across all genres of Australian music. They commenced in 1987. 

! 
|-
| 2018
| The Stranger in the Mirror]
| Best Jazz Album
| 
| 
|-

References

Australian musicians
Living people
Year of birth missing (living people)